First Church of Christ, or variants thereof, may refer to:

 First Church of Christ, Congregational (disambiguation)
 First Church of Christ, Scientist (disambiguation)
 The First Church of Christ, Scientist (Boston, Massachusetts)
 First Church of Christ, Unitarian in Lancaster, Massachusetts
 First Church of Christ, Wethersfield, Connecticut